Magda is a six-minute animated film by independent filmmaker Chel White, from a story written and read by monologist Joe Frank.

A first love is corrupted as a man recalls his affair with a beautiful circus contortionist in this stop-motion animation of wooden manikins.  

Short of the Week's Serafima Serafimova describes Magda as “A love story so beautiful and incredibly touching in its simplicity… it’s a real gem of untarnished beauty. '" 

Visually, the film explores the use of extreme telephoto lenses, creating enigmatic scenes that reveal themselves over time, and ghostly figures drifting in-and-out of focus. Animation World Network describes the aesthetic as "swimming in the rack-focus sea of a telephoto lens with an extremely shallow depth of field. This can feel like the equivalent of driving through a thick fog, but it is also a very efficient means of directing the eye to the relevant action in some very busy sets." The characters in the film are derived from basic, pose-able wooden manikins found in any art supply store, but extensively redesigned and rigged to be usable as stop motion puppets.

Awards/Film Festivals
Grand Jury Prize for Best Animated Short - 2004 Florida Film Festival
World Premiere - Rotterdam International Film Festival 
Gold Hugo Nominee  - Chicago International Film Festival

Compilation
The Animation Show, Volume 1 and 2, DVD, MTV Home Entertainment/Paramount (2007)

References

External links
 
 

1990s American animated films
1998 films
American avant-garde and experimental films